Little Africa was an African American neighborhood in Greenwich Village and particularly the South Village, from the mid-19th century until about the turn of the 20th century. The dominant African American center in Manhattan of its period, as part of a general northward march uptown it was preceded by the Five Points (also known as "Little Africa" or Stagg Town), and succeeded by the Tenderloin, San Juan Hill and eventually Harlem. Its main thoroughfare was Thompson Street, and also the complex of Minetta Lane/Street/Place, and much of its historic area lies with the current Sullivan-Thompson Historic District.

Little Africa initially developed as a reaction to the violence of the 1834 anti-abolition riots in the Five Points. It formed a demographic contrast to the smaller, more rural and middle-class Seneca Village located farther north until its razing in 1857.  The urban neighborhood suffered great violence itself during the 1863 draft riots, although in the aftermath of the Civil War its African American population grew with the migration of Southern freedmen.

Two centuries before the urban neighborhood, under Dutch colonial rule there was a complex of African-owned farms in approximately the same area north of New Amsterdam.

References

African-American history in New York City
Former New York City neighborhoods
Greenwich Village